Microcrambus elegans, the elegant grass-veneer moth, is a moth of the family Crambidae. It is found from Ontario, Quebec and Maine to Florida, west to Texas, north to Kansas and Illinois.

The wingspan is 12–15 mm. Adults are on wing from June to August in the north and from March to October in the south. There is one generation per year in the north and multiple in the south.

The larvae feed on Poaceae species.

References

External links

Bug Guide
Images

Crambini
Moths described in 1860
Moths of North America